Oil for the Lamps of China is a 1933 novel by Alice Tisdale Hobart which became a bestseller in 1934. It was originally published by Bobbs Merrill and reprinted by EastBridge in 2002.

The novel describes the life in China of a young executive in an American oil company from the early 1900s through the Nationalist Revolution of the 1920s. The young protagonist, Stephen Chase, is successful in understanding China and building business, but in the turmoil of China's Nationalist Revolution of the 1920s, he is betrayed by the company and by the new China which emerges. Hobart's husband was an executive for the Standard Oil Company.

The novel was the basis of a 1935 film by the same name starring Pat O'Brien.

Reception
The author Emily Hahn wrote in the Shanghai journal T'ien Hsia in the mid-1930s that "unfortunately" Hobart "seems to share a strange idea of the public’s that all persons whose skin-pigmentation differs from ours must use a bastard eighteenth-century Biblical sort of elocution." Hahn continues:

A review called the 2002 reprint "timely" because "the atmosphere which greets the foreign businessperson in coastal China today closely mirrors that of Shanghai in the 1930s," and that Hobart was  "especially good at conveying that first-time Marco Polo-like feeling of discovery that China still communicates to the uninitiated Western sojourner." These insights are conveyed in "down-to-earth non-academic" language.

Notes

References
 
 
 .
 T. Barrett, "Review," Bulletin of the School of Oriental and African Studies   67.1 (February 2004), pp 124–126.

1933 American novels
American novels adapted into films
Novels set in China